The 2012–13 Northern Football League season was the 115th in the history of Northern Football League, a football competition in England.

Division One

Division One featured 19 clubs which competed in the division last season, along with five new clubs.
 Clubs promoted from Division Two:
 Gillford Park, who also changed name to Celtic Nation
 Hebburn Town
 Team Northumbria
 Plus:
 Darlington 1883, new club formed after original club folded
 Durham City, resigned from the Northern Premier League

From this league, only Bishop Auckland, Celtic Nation, Darlington 1883 and Spennymoor Town applied for promotion.

League table

Results

Division Two

Division Two featured 18 clubs which competed in the division last season, along with four new clubs:
Clubs relegated from Division One:
 Jarrow Roofing BCA
 Stokesley Sports Club
 Tow Law Town
Plus:
 Ryhope Colliery Welfare, promoted from the Wearside Football League

League table

Results

References

External links
 Northern Football League official site

Northern Football League seasons
9